The Anglo-French Alliance is the name for the alliance between Great Britain and France between 1716 and 1731. It formed part of the stately quadrille in which the Great Powers of Europe repeatedly switched partners to try to build a superior alliance.

Creation 
Following the end of the War of the Spanish Succession by the Peace of Utrecht (1713–15), British and French interests converged as they wished to stop the expansion of Spanish and Russian power. Although British Whig politicians had attacked the Peace of Utrecht under the slogan "No Peace Without Spain", given it seemingly placed Spain under French control, they soon developed close relations with Paris having returned to power following the Hanoverian succession. France faced an uncertain succession, as their king Louis XV was currently young and childless. Britain was wary of alienating the much-larger France. Negotiations led to the creation of the Anglo-French Alliance somewhere in late 1716.

On 4 January 1717, it became the Triple Alliance (1717) when the Dutch Republic joined the Britain and France against the looming threat of a resurgent Spain. That threat proved real when Spain recaptured Sardinia from Habsburg Austria with little opposition in August–October 1717, which was then followed by a Spanish landing in Sicily in July 1718. The three states were joined by Austria on 2 August 1718, thus forming the Quadruple Alliance. These four states co-operated during the War of the Quadruple Alliance to stop these Spanish attempts to conquer parts of Italy. 

Shortly afterwards they managed to check the Russian advance across the Baltic.

End 
The birth of a Dauphin in 1729 began to dissolve the French interest in the alliance, as their future was increasingly secure. In Britain a group of Austrophiles suggested that Austria would make a better potential partner for Britain. The actions of the French Chief Minister Cardinal Fleury were increasingly hostile towards Britain. The French failure to support the British during the Anglo-Spanish War (1727–1729) convinced many that they were no longer a reliable ally but were instead returning to the traditional position of a rival. The end of the alliance was never formally declared, but by early 1731, it was widely considered to be over.

In 1731, Britain, sensing the direction Cardinal Fleury was taking France, concluded an alliance with Austria. By 1742, Britain and France were on opposite sides during the War of the Austrian Succession and their colonial rivalry in North America continued. Some have suggested that between 1688 and 1815 Britain and France were 'natural enemies', and the period has become known as the Second Hundred Years' War, but the 17-year periods spent as allies has been used to challenge the theory that the two states were implacable enemies.

See also
 Foreign alliances of France
 Anglo-Austrian Alliance
 Anglo-Prussian Alliance (1756)
 France–United Kingdom relations

Bibliography
 Browning, Reed. The Duke of Newcastle. Yale University Press, 1975.
 McLynn, Frank. 1759: The Year Britain Became Master of the World. Pimlico, 2005.
 Murphy, Orvile T. Charles Gravier: Comete de Vergennes: French Diplomacy in the Age of Revolution. New York Press, 1982.
 Simms, Brendan. Three Victories and a Defeat: The Rise and Fall of the First British Empire. Penguin Books, 2008.
 Whiteley, Peter. Lord North: The Prime Minister who lost America. The Hambledon Press, 1996.

Treaties of the Kingdom of Great Britain
18th-century military alliances
1716 treaties
Treaties of the Kingdom of France
Military alliances involving France
France
18th century in France
1716 in Great Britain
France–United Kingdom military relations
France–Great Britain relations